Topock Maze is an archaeological site located south of Interstate 40 near Needles, California. The site consists of numerous rows and groups of parallel lines; while hypothesized to be a geoglyph, the purpose, age, and creators of the lines are disputed. A 1908 report by Edward M. Curtis suggested that the site was built as some sort of maze or labyrinth, inspiring its name; however, later research has concluded that this was not the site's purpose. A 1978 study by Arda M. Haenszel proposed that the lines were prehistoric and had some sort of religious or ceremonial significance to the native Mojave people; this conclusion was supported by a 2005 study. Archaeologist Ruth Arlene Musser-Lopez published a study in 2011 which concluded that the lines were created recently, likely by gravel scraping operations during railroad construction in the 1880s; however, they were built over a preexisting prehistoric art site.

The site was added to the National Register of Historic Places on October 5, 1978.

References

Archaeological sites on the National Register of Historic Places in California
National Register of Historic Places in San Bernardino County, California
Needles, California